Joshua Aaron Server (born April 11, 1979) is an American actor best known for being the only All That cast member to remain through all six original seasons.

Acting career
Server began on All That at age 14 to tape the pilot for the show. His characters include Detective Dan, Earboy, Jimmy Bond Agent 1/7, and Bernie Kibbitz. In 1997, he and a few cast members starred in the 1997 feature film Good Burger (based on the All That sketch of the same name).

While he was on All That, Server made guest appearances on other Nickelodeon shows. He appeared in a Season 3 episode of The Secret World of Alex Mack in 1996. Starting in 1997, he and other All That alumni were panelists on the Nickelodeon game show, Figure It Out where he appeared until 1998. In 1999, he then appeared in the Season 3 finale of Kenan & Kel, and the pilot for The Amanda Show, along with All That fellow alumnus, Kenan Thompson.

After All That
After he and the last cast members of the original All That had left, Server moved on to host Oh Yeah! Cartoons for Season 3 in 2000-2001. Afterward, he made another guest appearance in a Season 3 episode of 100 Deeds for Eddie McDowd in 2002.

Server returned to All That for its 10th Anniversary special which aired in 2005, reprising a few of his characters. In 2006, he made a guest appearance in a third season episode of Drake & Josh.

In 2006, Server began starring in the web series Laugh Out Loud with Kenan Thompson. In early 2007, he appeared in a season 3 episode of Ned's Declassified School Survival Guide and an episode of Sam & Cat in 2014.

He's made several All That reunion-type appearances, such as 2015 New York Comic-Con and a 2018 episode of Wild 'n Out, culminating in recurring in the 2019 revival of All That, along with Denberg, and Mitchell, starting with the season premiere.

Personal life
Server was born in Highland Park, Illinois. He has a younger sister who was born in 1982. He is good friends with all of his castmates on All That, including Kenan Thompson and Kel Mitchell. He is also good friends with Nickelodeon series stars Drake Bell, Josh Peck, and Miranda Cosgrove. Server had stated in the 1998 collector's guide, All That: Fresh out the Box, that his hobbies include going to the movies, rollerblading, the beach, and working out. Server is Jewish.

Filmography

Television

Film

Other

Awards and nominations
 1997 Kids' Choice Awards
 Nominated: All That (Favorite TV Show)
 1999 Kids' Choice Awards
 Won: All That (Favorite TV Show)
 2000 Kids' Choice Awards
 Won: All That (Favorite TV Show)

References

External links
 
 Josh Server at TV Guide
 Josh's LOL Web series

1979 births
20th-century American male actors
21st-century American male actors
Male actors from Illinois
20th-century American Jews
American male child actors
American male film actors
American male comedians
Jewish American male actors
Jewish male comedians
Jewish American comedians
American male television actors
Living people
People from Highland Park, Illinois
Comedians from Illinois
20th-century American comedians
21st-century American comedians
21st-century American Jews